In the United States, a benefit corporation or B corporation (or in several jurisdictions including Delaware, a public-benefit corporation or PBC) is a type of for-profit corporate entity, authorized by 35 U.S. states and the District of Columbia, that includes positive impact on society, workers, the community and the environment in addition to profit as its legally defined goals, in that the definition of "best interest of the corporation" is specified to include those impacts. Laws concerning conventional corporations (referred to as "C corporations" by the IRS) typically do not specify the definition of "best interest of the corporation", which has led to the interpretation that increasing shareholder value (profits and/or share price) is the only overarching or compelling interest of a corporation. Benefit corporations may not differ much from traditional C corporations. A C corporation may change to a B corporation merely by stating in its approved corporate bylaws that it is a benefit corporation; however in certain jurisdictions (especially Delaware), the terms "public benefit corporation" or "PBC" are also required to be in the legal name of B corporations.

A business may choose to file as a benefit corporation instead of a traditional C corporation for many reasons; for example, a 2013 study done by MBA students at the University of Maryland showed that one main reason businesses in Maryland had chosen to file as benefit corporations was for community recognition of their values. A benefit corporation's directors and officers operate the business with the same authority and behavior as in a traditional corporation, but are required to consider the impact of their decisions not only on shareholders but also on employees, customers, the community, and local and global environment. For an example of what additional impacts directors and officers are required to consider, view the 2015 Maryland Code § 5-6C-07 – Duties of director. The nature of the business conducted by the corporation does not affect their status as a benefit corporation, instead providing them protection for including public benefits in their missions and activities.

Deciding to become a benefit corporation is the choice of a company that wants to make a profit while simultaneously addressing social, economical, and environmental needs, or to operate as a traditional for-profit business corporation model. Both have their own benefits and costs.

Shareholders typically judge a company's well-being on its long-term financial success, in addition to public perception and quality of product, but in recent decades quarterly trading reporting has led to hyper-focus on short-term gains. As such, the perception that corporate directors are legally bound to maximize shareholder value has grown, although it is not true. The benefit corporation legislation ensures that a director is required to consider other public benefits in addition to profit, preventing shareholders from using a drop in stock value as evidence for dismissal or a lawsuit against the corporation. Transparency provisions require benefit corporations to publish annual benefit reports of their social and environmental performance using a comprehensive, credible, independent, and transparent third-party standard. However, few of the states have included provisions for removal of benefit corporation status or fines if the companies fail to publish benefit reports that comply with the state statutes.

There are around 12 third-party standards that satisfy the reporting requirements of most benefit corporation statutes. A benefit corporation need not be certified or audited by the third-party standard. Instead, it may use third-party standards solely as a rubric to measure its own performance. In this case, some authors have examined and pointed out that in the current 36 states who recognize benefit corporations as legal business forms the law regarding the requirement of certifications for operation differs from state to state. For example, in the state of Indiana, there is no requirement of certifications from a third party needed to operate as a benefit corporation. It has also been suggested that other organizations that choose to operate under the business formation of a benefit corporation may also want to engage in receiving a B Corp certification from a third party, such as B Lab. Other research promotes the synergy between a benefit corporation and employee ownership.

As a matter of law, in the 36 states who recognize this type of business form, a benefit corporation is used "to merge the traditional for-profit business corporation model with a non-profit model by allowing social entrepreneurs to consider interests beyond those of maximizing shareholder wealth."

History
In April 2010, Maryland became the first U.S. state to pass benefit corporation legislation. , 35 states and Washington, D.C., have passed legislation allowing for the creation of benefit corporations:

Connecticut's benefit corporation law is the first to allow "preservation clauses", which allow the corporation's founders to prevent it from reverting to a 'For Profit' entity at the will of their shareholders.

Illinois established a new type of entity called the "benefit LLC", making the state the first to allow limited liability companies the same opportunities afforded to Illinois corporations under the state's benefit corporation law.

In December 2015, the Italian Parliament passed legislation recognizing a new kind of organization, named Società Benefit, which was directly modeled after benefit corporations in the United States. This made Italy the first country in the world to make this legal status available across its entire territory.

In 2018, Colombia introduced benefit corporation legislation. In May 2018, the leader of the British Columbia Green Party introduced a bill to amend the Business Corporations Act to incorporate benefit companies in British Columbia, Canada.

Washington created social purpose corporations in 2012 with a similar focus and intent.

Differences from traditional corporations
Historically, U.S. corporate law has not been structured or tailored to address the situation of for-profit companies that wish to pursue a social or environmental mission. While corporations generally have the ability to pursue a broad range of activities, corporate decision-making is usually justified in terms of creating long-term shareholder value.

The idea that a corporation has as its purpose to maximize financial gain for its shareholders was first articulated in Dodge v. Ford Motor Co. in 1919. Over time, through both law and custom, the concept of "shareholder primacy" has come to be widely accepted. This was reaffirmed in 2010 for Delaware corporations by the case , in which the Delaware Chancery Court stated that a non-financial mission that "seeks not to maximize the economic value of a for-profit Delaware corporation for the benefit of its stockholders" is inconsistent with directors’ fiduciary duties. However, the fiduciary duties do not list profit or financial gains specifically, and to date no corporate charters have been written that identify profit as one of those duties.

In the ordinary course of business, decisions made by a corporation's directors are generally protected by the business judgment rule, under which courts are reluctant to second-guess operating decisions made by directors. In a takeover or change of control situation, however, courts give less deference to directors’ decisions and require that directors obtain the highest price in order to maximize shareholder value in the transaction. Thus a corporation may be unable to maintain its focus on social and environmental factors in a change of control situation because of the pressure to maximize shareholder value.

Mission-driven businesses, impact investors, and social entrepreneurs are constrained by this legal framework, which is not equipped to accommodate for-profit entities whose mission is central to their existence.

Even in states that have passed "constituency" statutes, which permit directors and officers of ordinary corporations to consider non-financial interests when making decisions, legal uncertainties make it difficult for mission-driven businesses to know when they are allowed to consider additional interests. Without clear case law, directors may still fear civil claims if they stray from their fiduciary duties to the owners of the business to maximize profit.

By contrast, benefit corporations expand the fiduciary duty of directors to require them to consider non-financial stakeholders as well as the interests of shareholders. This gives directors and officers of mission-driven businesses the legal protection to pursue an additional mission and consider additional stakeholders. The enacting state's benefit corporation statutes are placed within existing state corporation codes so that the codes apply to benefit corporations in every respect except those explicit provisions unique to the benefit corporation form.

Provisions
Typical major provisions of a benefit corporation are:

Purpose
 Shall create general public benefit.
 Shall have the right to name specific public benefit purposes
 The creation of public benefit is in the best interests of the benefit corporation.

Accountability
 Directors' duties are to make decisions in the best interests of the corporation
 Directors and officers shall consider effect of decisions on shareholders and employees, suppliers, customers, community, environment (together the "stakeholders")

Transparency
 Shall publish annual Benefit Report in accordance with recognized third party standards for defining, reporting, and assessing social and environmental performance
 Benefit Report delivered to: 1) all shareholders; and 2) public website with exclusion of proprietary data

Right of action
 Only shareholders and directors have right of action
 Right of action can be for 1) violation of or failure to pursue general or specific public benefit; 2) violation of duty or standard of conduct

Change of control/purpose/structure
 Shall require a minimum status vote which is a 2/3 vote in most states, but slightly higher in a few states

Benefit corporations are treated like all other corporations for tax purposes.

Benefits
Benefit corporation laws address concerns held by entrepreneurs who wish to raise growth capital but fear losing control of the social or environmental mission of their business. In addition, the laws provide companies the ability to consider factors other than the highest purchase offer at the time of sale, in spite of the ruling on Revlon, Inc. v. MacAndrews & Forbes Holdings, Inc. Chartering as a benefit corporation also allows companies to distinguish themselves as businesses with a social conscience, and as one that aspires to a standard they consider higher than profit-maximization for shareholders. Yvon Chouinard, founder of Patagonia, has written "Benefit corporation legislation creates the legal framework to enable companies like Patagonia to stay mission-driven through succession, capital raises, and even changes in ownership, by institutionalizing the values, culture, processes, and high standards put in place by founding entrepreneurs."

Benefit corporation vs. certified benefit corporation 
There is a difference between being filing as a benefit corporation in a state, and being a certified benefit corporation also known as a B Corporation. B Corporations voluntarily promise to run their firm with social and environmental causes as a concern. To receive their certification from B Lab they must score a minimum of 80 out of 200 on a survey called the B impact assessment. Next, they will have to pass through an audit process. Finally, the firms wishing to remain certified will be required to pay an annual fee to B Lab. Furthermore, companies will pledge to incorporate as a benefit corporation before their re-certification.

Taxation 
A public benefit corporation is a legal entity that is organized and taxed as either an S corporation or C corporation. Founders will want to keep in mind that C-corporations experience a double tax associated with profits and again with dividends or payouts to shareholders. S corporations are a legal entity that escapes this double taxation but there are certain stipulations that an entity will have to consider before being able to file as an S corporation. If you are currently an S or C corporation your company will not change its tax status when you transfer to a public benefit corporation. If you are currently an LLC, partnership or sole proprietorship then you will have to change tax status. While public benefit corporations are taxed the same as their underlying corporation status, there is added benefit to taxation on charitable contributions. If a firm makes donations to a qualifying non-profit the charitable contributions receive a tax deductible status. This will lower a firm's taxes compared to a typical C-corporation that is not donating money and only focusing on short term profits.

Possible incentives to change to a benefit corporation 
Reorganizing as a public benefit corporation affords a corporation's directors and founders protection from shareholder lawsuits when pursuing decisions that benefit the public at the expense of short-term profits. Furthermore, firms that transition typically experience advantages in retaining employees, increasing their customer loyalty and attracting prospective talent that will mesh well into the company culture.

Transition process 
Changing status to a public benefit corporation requires several steps. First, the firm should choose one or more specific public benefit projects that it will pursue. Next, the articles of incorporation should be amended to state at the beginning that the firm is a public benefit corporation. The term public benefit corporation (PBC) or another abbreviation may be added to the entity's name if the founders choose. Finally the share certificates that are issued by the entity should state that the firm is a public benefit corporation. A shareholder vote is required to amend the articles which must include "non-voting" shares. The vote must gain a two-thirds majority to pass, depending on the Articles of Incorporation. Shareholders should be notified early that dissenter's rights apply. Dissenter's rights mean that those that vote against the amendment and qualify, may require the company to buy back their shares at fair value before the change. Firms making the transition should also perform a "due diligence review" of their business contracts, affairs and status in order to avoid any unforeseen liability associated with changing the form of the entity.

The transition process is different state by state but for Colorado it is as follows. First, the firm must prepare the aforementioned amended articles. Then, they also amend their bylaws and assign responsibilities to the board of directors. Next, the amendments must be approved by the directors before going to a shareholder vote. Finally they file the amended articles of incorporation with the secretary of the state.

If the prior entity is an LLC or partnership there is an extra step required. For these entities the articles of incorporation themselves and the related bylaws must first be prepared and filed with the state secretary. Only then will it be possible to merge or transition the previous form into the benefit corporation.

Investor and consumer preferences 
According to William Mitchell Law Review journal, about 68 million US customers have a preference for making decisions about their purchases based on a sense of environmental or social responsibility. Some individuals even go as far as using their purchases to "punish" companies for bad corporate behavior when it pertains to environmental or social cause. While others do the opposite, and use their purchasing power to reward firms that they believe are doing social or environmental good. The Mitchell Law Review also states that around 49% of Americans have at some point in time boycotted firms whose behavior they see as "not in the best interest of society." Recent research also suggests that when variables like price and quality are held constant, 87% of customers would switch from a less socially responsible brand to a more socially responsible competitor.

See also 

 
 

Examples of Delaware benefit corporations:

References

External links

 Social Enterprise Law Tracker – Interactive map visualizing the progression of benefit corporation legislation across the United States
 BenefitCorp.net – Information about creating and running benefit corporations 
 Vermont benefit corporation statute – an example of legislation
 California benefit corporation statute

Social economy in the United States
Social entrepreneurship
Corporations
Public economics